Mahananda (Nanda) Dasgupta FAA, FAIP, FAPS  is an experimental physicist at the Heavy Ion Accelerator Facility in the Department of Nuclear Physics of the Australian National University, whose work focuses on accelerator-based nuclear fusion and fission.

Dasgupta has made key contributions in developing theoretical models to quantum tunnelling of composite objects, and has also designed efficient experimental particle detection equipment. Her current work aims to understand the quantum interactions of stable and unstable exotic nuclei, underpinning opportunities with next generation accelerators. Dasgupta's work is also advancing understanding on the transition from quantum to classical behaviour, which is important for the development of nanoscale technologies.

In 1992, Dasgupta completed her PhD at the Tata Institute of Fundamental Research in Mumbai, India. Shortly after, she moved to Australia, and in 1998 was awarded a Queen Elizabeth II Fellowship by the Australian Research Council.

In 2003, she became the first woman appointed to a tenured position in the Research School of Physical Sciences and Engineering at the Australian National University, and in 2004 she undertook a nationwide lecture tour as the 2004 Australian Institute of Physics (AIP) "Women in Physics" lecturer.

In 2006, she was awarded the prestigious Pawsey medal from the Australian Academy of Science, which honours outstanding research in physics in Australia by a scientist under the age of 40.

Dasgupta was elected a fellow of the Australian Academy of Science in 2011, and that same year was awarded the inaugural Georgina Sweet Australian Laureate Fellowship from the Australian Academy of Science. The fellowship funded Dasgupta in her efforts to increase the profile of women in science and work towards advancing early career researchers as well as facilitate leadership pathways for senior women researchers.

She is also currently a member of the National Committee for Physics.

That year she also represented the Group of Eight universities at the Women in Science and Engineering summit at Parliament House.

In 2019, Dasgupta was elected a fellow of the American Physical Society for "advancing the understanding of nuclear fusion through precision measurements, highlighting the role of quantum superpositions and demonstrating the suppression of fusion for weakly-bound nuclei."

Dasgupta has published more than 80 papers in journals such as Nature, Physics Letters and Physical Review C.

References

External links 
 Professor Mahananda Dasgupta's profile at the Australian National University's Department of Nuclear Physics 
 The Conversation, 24 August 2011, "Seriously, why aren't there more women in science?" Dasgupta et al., 
 Professor Mahananda Dasgupta, recipient of the Australian Research Council's 2001 Georgina Sweet Australian Laureate Fellowship 
 Professor Mahananda Dasgupta profile, Puzzling.org 

Academic staff of the Australian National University
Australian women scientists
Living people
Tata Institute of Fundamental Research alumni
Fellows of the Australian Academy of Science
Year of birth missing (living people)
Australian women academics
Fellows of the American Physical Society